Shuto Kono (幸野 志有人, born 4 May 1993) is a Japanese football player who currently plays as a midfielder for FC Oberneuland.

National team career
In October 2009, Kono was elected Japan U-17 national team for 2009 U-17 World Cup. He played 1 match against Switzerland.

Club statistics
Updated to 23 February 2017.

References

External links

J League Date
Profile at V-Varen Nagasaki
Profile at JEF United Chiba

1993 births
Living people
Association football people from Tokyo
Japanese footballers
Japanese expatriate footballers
Japan youth international footballers
J1 League players
J2 League players
J3 League players
FC Tokyo players
FC Tokyo U-23 players
Oita Trinita players
FC Machida Zelvia players
V-Varen Nagasaki players
JEF United Chiba players
Renofa Yamaguchi FC players
Sydney Olympic FC players
J.League U-22 Selection players
Association football midfielders
Japanese expatriate sportspeople in Australia
Expatriate soccer players in Australia